The following people played for the Boston Bulldogs for at least one game in the 1926 AFL regular season, the only one of the team’s (and the league’s) existence:

1 Also played end
2 Played wingback, fullback, and blocking back
3 Finished season with the Providence Steam Roller
4 Played blocking back and wingback
5 Also played wingback
6 Also playing fullback and end
7 Played for the Frankford Yellow Jackets of the NFL after the folding of the Bulldogs
8 Started season with the Providence Steam Roller
9 Position later known as quarterback
10 Started season with the Newark Bears
11 Also played guard
12 Also played guard and center

 
Boston Bulldogs (AFL) players